The Poti class was the NATO reporting name for a group of anti-submarine warfare (ASW) corvettes built for the Soviet Navy. The Soviet designation was Project 204 small anti-submarine ships. These ships were the first Soviet warships powered by gas turbine engines; two propellers were mounted in tunnels to give a very shallow draught. A twin  gun mounting provided self-defence. Three ships of the class were exported to Romania and six to Bulgaria during the Cold War. By 2008, all ships of the class were no longer extant.

Design and description
Designated Maly Protivo Lodochny Korabl (Russian: Small Anti-submarine Ship) by the Soviet Navy, Project 204 (NATO reporting name Poti class) was the first class of corvettes not based on the traditional World War II anti-submarine (ASW) design constructed by the Soviets. The Poti class reversed a trend of smaller ships, being larger than the preceding  and es, which allowed the vessels to mount larger guns. The Poti class were also the first large Soviet warships to incorporate gas turbines and were the fastest ASW warships ever constructed by them.

The ships were powered by a two shaft combined diesel and gas propulsion system consisting of two M-2 gas turbines creating  and two M503A diesel engines creating . The two propellers were mounted in thrust tubes which extended the length of the prop. The gas turbines exhausted through ports in the transom and were also used to power air compressors which exhausted into the thrust tubes to create extra thrust.

In Soviet service, the corvettes were armed with a single turret mounted forward comprising twin /80 dual-purpose guns. Some of the earlier Soviet ships had open mounts, with later units having closed units. The guns had 85 degree elevation and could fire a  shell to a range of  up to 120 rounds per minute. They were also equipped with either twin-mounted or quad-mounted  torpedo tubes for Soviet Type 40 ASW torpedoes. The first units constructed mounted two 16-tubed RBU-2500 ASW rocket launchers, with later vessels receiving two 12-tubed RBU-6000 ASW models.

The Soviet Poti class were equipped with Don 2 surface search radar, Strut Curve air search radar, Muff Cobb fire control radar. They also had one hull-mounted high-frequency Herkules sonar and one Hormone dipping sonar. For electronic countermeasures, the corvettes had two Watch Dog units. The corvettes had a complement of 80 officers and ratings in Soviet service.

Ships

A total of 66 ships were built between 1960 and 1968. In the Soviet Union the Poti-class corvettes were decommissioned by the late 1980s and replaced in service by the s.
Builders were:

Kerch yard 24 ships
Zelenodolsk yard : 32 ships
Khabarovsk yard: 8 ships

Export

Bulgaria
Following World War II, Bulgaria entered the Soviet Union's sphere of influence. By the 1950s, the Bulgarian military had been re-organised along Soviet lines and equipped with Soviet armaments. In 1955, Bulgaria acquired Kronstahdt-class submarine chasers to outfit their ASW forces. Bulgaria required replacements for these ships as they became obsolete and six Poti-class ships were transferred between 1975 and 1990 to the Bulgarian Navy. The former Soviet numbers of most of the individual ships are not known, but it is known that MPK-59, MPK-77 and MPK-109 were among the ships given to Bulgaria. By 2008, all of Bulgaria's Poti-class corvettes had been discarded.

Romania
Post World War II, Romania fell into the Soviet Union's sphere of influence and joined the Warsaw Pact. However, by the beginning of 1964 Romania began to diverge from Soviet direction and as a result, saw limited military support afterwards, with the rift between the two countries widening in 1968 after the invasion of Czechoslovakia. Three ships were transferred to the Romanian Navy in 1970. The Romanian ships carried the older RBU-2500 ASW rocket launchers and twin  torpedo tubes using Soviet Type 53 torpedoes. All three ships were constructed at Zelenodolsk and were transferred upon completion. The former Soviet numbers of the individual ships are not known, but it is known that MPK-106 and MPK-125 were among the ships given to Romania.

See also
 List of ships of the Soviet Navy
 List of ships of Russia by project number

Notes

Citations

References

External links

 
 boinaslava.net

 
Corvette classes
Ships of the Soviet Navy
Corvettes of the Soviet Navy
Corvettes of the Bulgarian Navy
Corvettes of the Romanian Naval Forces